Labia piercings are one type of female genital piercing. This piercing can be placed either through the labia minora or the labia majora. They are one of the simpler and more common genital piercings performed on women, and are often pierced in symmetrical pairs.  Like all genital piercings, depending on jewellery and placement, they may provide additional stimulation to one or both partners during sexual intercourse.

History and culture 
There is little direct evidence of pre-contemporary practice of labia piercings, outside of anecdotal reports of the use of these piercings as chastity devices.  Like many genital piercings, the contemporary origin of labia piercing resides in the BDSM culture that gave rise to the resurgence of body piercing in contemporary society.  In contemporary practice, these piercings often simply fill a decorative role, rather than a purely sexual one.

This piercing plays a prominent role in the French erotic novel, Story of O. The heroine, O, has a hole pierced through a labium, through which a stainless-steel ring is inserted. Another ring is linked to it, and to that, a metal disk with identifying information on it, including the name of her Master, the mysterious Sir Stephen.

Comparing piercings of labia majora, minora 
Labia majora (outer labia) piercings heal slower than labia minora (inner labia) piercings, depending on the anatomy of the individual. They also tend to be more painful because there is more tissue to pierce through.  Stretching of labia minora piercings occurs on its own in most cases due to the relatively high elasticity of the tissue, whereas labia majora piercings are much less likely to do so.

Jewellery 
Almost any type of jewellery can be found in labia minora piercings, although rings are the most commonly used jewelry, both as initial jewelry, and on a long-term basis.  Both types of labia piercings can be stretched to accommodate large jewellery; the wearing of heavy jewellery in these piercings may be a form of ongoing or temporary sexual stimulation.  Both types can also be stretched to accommodate flesh tunnel or flesh plug style jewellery. 

Jewellery worn in labia piercings may have a fetish purpose.  Rings or other specialised jewellery may be worn to block access to the vagina, as a form of short-term or long-term non-surgical infibulation.  Other chastity devices might also be worn that make use of the piercing, sometimes incorporating locks.

See also 
 Body piercing
 Labia stretching

References

Female genital piercings